Fairfield Transit (FAST) provides general public fixed route bus service through eight local routes. All FAST buses are wheelchair accessible and most are equipped with bike racks.

Routes

Fixed routes 
FAST runs eight bus lines within the city of Fairfield (including Cordelia) with transfer hubs at the Fairfield Transportation Center (FTC), Fairfield–Vacaville Amtrak station, Walmart store and Solano Town Center.

External links 

 Official website

References 

Bus transportation in California
Public transportation in Solano County, California
Fairfield, California